State Road 10 was a state highway in Florida from 1923 through 1945, when the majority of numbered highways in the state were renumbered.  Today, the route is related to the following routes:

 State Road 61 from Georgia to south of Tallahassee
 State Road 363 from south of Tallahassee to north of St. Marks
 State Road 30 from north of St. Marks to east of Carrabelle
 State Road 30A from east of Carrabelle to Carrabelle
 State Road 30 from Carrabelle to west of Panama City
 State Road 79 from west of Panama City to Ebro
 State Road 20 from Ebro to Valparaiso
 State Road 85 in Valparaiso
 State Road 397 from Valparaiso to Eglin Air Force Base
 unnumbered through Eglin Air Force Base
 State Road 85 from south of Eglin Air Force Base to Fort Walton Beach
 State Road 30 from Fort Walton Beach to Navarre
 State Road 87 from Navarre to Milton
 State Road 10 from Milton to Riverview
 State Road 10A from Riverview to Pensacola
 State Road 365 from Wakulla to Shadeville
 State Road 61 from Shadeville to Medart
 State Road 375 from Medart to Sopchoppy
 State Road 377 from Sopchoppy to west of St. Teresa Beach
 State Road 30 from west of Newport to Newport
 unnumbered northeast from Newport
 State Road 368 from Crawfordville to Arran

010
U.S. Route 98
U.S. Route 90